Şenol İbişi (born 17 March 1979) is a retired German football midfielder.

References

1979 births
Living people
German people of Turkish descent
German footballers
KFC Uerdingen 05 players
Altay S.K. footballers
Elazığspor footballers
Eyüpspor footballers
Germania Teveren players
SV 19 Straelen players
Association football midfielders
Süper Lig players
Footballers from Duisburg